Auffenberg, ennobled von Auffenberg, is a German-language surname. Notable people with the surname include:
 Franz Xaver von Auffenberg (1744-1815), Austrian general
 Joseph von Auffenberg (1798-1857), German dramatist
 Moritz von Auffenberg (1852-1928), Austro-Hungarian general and minister of war
 Walter Auffenberg (1928-2004), American biologist

German-language surnames